The State of Damascus was one of the six states established by the French General Henri Gouraud in the French Mandate of Syria which followed the San Remo conference of 1920 and the defeat of King Faisal's short-lived monarchy in Syria.

The other states were the State of Aleppo (1920), the State of Alawites (1920), the State of Jabal Druze (1921), and The Sanjak of Alexandretta (1921). The State of Greater Lebanon (1920) became later the modern country of Lebanon.

Establishment 

The State of Damascus was declared by the French General Henri Gouraud on 3 September 1920, with Damascus as its capital. The first president of the new state was Haqqi Al-Azm. The state of Damascus included Damascus and its surrounding region, in addition to the cities of Homs, Hama and the Orontes river valley.

The new Damascus state lost four Qada's (sub-districts) that had been part of the Vilayet (district) of Damascus during Ottoman times to the mainly Christian Mount Lebanon to create the new State of Greater Lebanon. The territory separated from Damascus corresponds today to the Biqa' valley plus south Lebanon. Damascus, and later Syria, continuously protested the separation of these lands and kept demanding them back throughout the mandate period. The population of these regions, which was mainly Muslim, also protested the separation from Damascus.

Syrian Federation and the State of Syria 
On 28 June 1922, general Gouraud announced the Syrian Federation which included the states of Damascus, Aleppo, and the Alawite state. In 1924, the Alawite State was separated again. The Syrian Federation became the State of Syria on 1 January 1925.

Population

See also 
French Mandate of Syria
State of Alawites
Jabal el Druze (state)
AlexandrettaHatay
State of Aleppo
List of French possessions and colonies
French colonial empire
French colonial flags

References 

1925 disestablishments in Asia
States and territories established in 1920
States and territories disestablished in 1925
History of Damascus
1920s in Mandatory Syria
Dissolution of the Ottoman Empire
Former French colonies
French Mandate for Syria and the Lebanon
Former countries of the interwar period